A pencil is a handheld instrument used to write and draw, usually on paper.

Pencil may also refer to:
 Pencil (optics), a beam of radiant energy in the form of a narrow cone or cylinder
 Pencil (mathematics), a family of geometric objects
 Matrix pencil, a pair of matrices used in a generalized eigenvalue problem
 Definite pencil, a particular case of matrix pencils
 Pencil2D, an open-source drawing and animation app
 Pencil (film), a 2016 Tamil film
 Apple Pencil, a stylus device released by Apple Inc.

See also
 Pencil detonator
 Pencil skirt
 Penciller, a stage in the creation of a comic book
 Pinsel (disambiguation)